Olivia Yan (Chinese: 甄詠蓓, born 9 July 1968) is a Hong Kong theatre playwright, director, actress, teacher and writer. With more than 20 years of experience in stage production, performance and theatre management, she has attracted batches of students eager to study under her.

Yan started attending Hong Kong Academy for Performing Arts in 1986. After graduating, she went to Britain and France to study acting, movement and postures under well known instructors Philippe Gaulier and Monika Pagneux. She co-founded Theatre Ensemble in 1993 and reorganised it into the PIP Cultural Industries Ltd. in 2008. She then founded the O Theatre Workshop in 2010 to be a distinctive brand for her works. in 2013, she partnered Anthony Wong and Joyce Cheung to found Dionysus Contemporary Theatre and is its Joint Artistic Director.

Awards 
 1993 – 2nd Hong Kong Drama Awards (HKDA) (1993) Best Supporting Actress (Comedy)
 2000 – 9th HKDA (2000) Best Actress (Comedy)
 2003 – Hong Kong Art Development Council (HKADC)'s Hong Kong Arts Development Awards – Young Artist Award (Drama)
 2005 – 14th HKDA (2005) Best Actress (Comedy)
 2014 – HKADC Hong Kong Arts Development Awards – Artist of the Year Award (Drama)

Productions 
 EQUUS (May 2014)
 Le Dieu Du Carnage (August 2015)
 Le Dieu Du Carnage (Re-run) (January 2016)
 Le Dieu Du Carnage (Huayi - Chinese Festival of Arts) (February 2016)
 A Midsummer Night's Dream (September 2016)
 A Midsummer Night's Dream (Huayi - Chinese Festival of Arts) (February 2017)
 Speed the Plow (September 2017)

References

Living people
1968 births
Hong Kong theatre people
Hong Kong women writers
21st-century Hong Kong actresses
Hong Kong directors
Hong Kong women artists